Magic Island may refer to:

Magic Island (Hawaii), a peninsula and neighborhood in Honolulu, Hawaii
Magic Island (West Virginia), an island in the Kanawha River
The Magic Island (book), by William Buehler Seabrook
Magic Island (film)
Magic Island (radio), an old-time radio program
Magic Island (video game), a 1995 video game developed by Arda Team